Falefā is located on the north eastern coast of Upolu island in Samoa. It was the ancient capital during the ‘Malo’ (‘government’) of Tupu Tafa'ifa (King) Fonoti. After having defeated his siblings Va'afusuaga and Samalaulu for control of Samoa, King Fonoti chose to rule from his new seat in Falefa, an honour remembered in its faalupega (Charter and Salutations) to this day.

Falefa is headed by the descendants of its two founders - Moe’ono Falealoga (tulafale-alii or 'matua) and Leutele Leutogatui (matuaalii), the sons of Tui Atua Lemua'iteleloloa and his wife, Leateafaiga. 

It is situated in the Anoama'a 1 electoral constituency which itself is situated within the larger ancient political 'district' of Anoama’a, a province of Atua. Atua is headed by the Tui Atua (sovereign of Atua), a title once held by the seer Tui Ātua Leutele (called Tui Atua Leutelelei'ite) in the 10th century, during Samoa's period of antiquity. Since the 17th century, this mantle has been occupied mainly by one of the two Tama-a-'āiga (maximal lineage chiefs) of Ātua's Salamasina line: Tupua Tamasese and Matā'afa.

Together with the village of Salani, Falefa is home to one of Samoa's main political families, 'Aiga Sā Fenunuivao (descendants of Fenunuivao, wife of King Muagututi'a and mother of the first Tupua, Fuiavailili). The family is led by Moe'ono and Leutele of Falefa and Tofua'iofo'ia and Fuimaono of Salani, and is the custodian of the Tama-a-'Āiga Tupua Tamasese title. Both the Tama-a-'āiga Tupua Tamasese and pāpā Tui Atua royal titles are currently held by Samoa's former Prime Minister and Head of State, His Highness Tui Atua Tupua Tamasese Efi.

 History & Culture 

 Establishment of Falefa 
Falefa is one of the oldest and largest settlements in Samoa, with its traditional borders stretching from Uafato to the East, Saoluafata to the west and Lotofaga on its southern border. Oral tradition and archaeological evidence from the nearby Sasoa'a Lapita discovery site in the Falefa valley place the date of settlement in the area to as far back as between 300B.C.

According to oral tradition, Falefa was founded by the two sons of Tui Atua Mua’iteleloa and Leateafaiga (daughter of Lufasiaitu of Uafato, Fagaloa) - Moe'ono Faleologa & his younger brother Leutele Leutogitui. Since then, Falefa has been headed by the descendants of these two brothers who hold the respective Moe'ono (tulafale-alii or 'matua') and Leutele (alii) titles. Leaving their birthplace at Fagaloa, they established their first settlement at the top of mountains overlooking Fagaloa Bay and the Falefa valley, called Manuao. The settlement was later moved down to the coast to its present site at the northern edge of the Falefa valley.

The size of Falefa was such that a centralised location was needed to centralize governance. 'O le Faleupolu o Sagapolu' - the administrative centre of Falefa - was created and in which both Leutele and Moe’ono reside. It is from this site that their successors continue to govern Falefa down to the present day. Other sub-villages followed; Saleapaga followed by Sagogu and Gagaeimalae. Moe'ono and Leutele bestowed titles on prominent individuals, creating leading Ali’i (sacred chief) titles Alai’asā, Lealaisalanoa and others who in turn, established 'vassal' houses of their own (called ‘Matai tautua’ to serve. These leading chiefs assist Moe'ono and Leutele with the administration of the growing district as part of Falefa's council of chiefs.

The brothers and their respective heirs traveled extensively throughout their domain - from Lemafatele (known as Le Mafa Pass today) to Sasoa'a (where Lapita pottery remains have been found), to Sauano and Saletele in the Fagaloa bay and the mountains overlooking the valley below where the village of Falefa stands today.

 Growth and new villages formed 
In later times, portions of Falefa's lands were gifted by subsequent rulers to form the settlements of Lufilufi, Lalomauga, Falevao as well as the villages of Sauano and Saletele in the Fagaloa Bay. Tui Atua Leutele-le'i'ite also gifted land to his nephew Puga (or Puna) to form the village of Faleapuna. Puna subsequently became a leading orator in the Atua district under the new title of Molio'o, until it became part of the Vaa-o-Fonoti district. These villages are historically tied to Falefa through their founding and through centuries of intricate political manoeuvering.

 Salamasina Kidnapping Plot 
Many years earlier, Tui Atua Togiai, the victor of the war of succession, had established his residence at Foganiutea in Fagaloa. His grandson Matautia lived in Saleaumua in the Aleipata district, where he had married Sooa’e. Before his wife had borne his child, Matautia was assassinated by Leifi and Tautolo. Fearing for her life and that of her child, Sooa'e fled Atua and left her family name of Levalasi to the Atua branch of her clan, thus founding of one of the most important families not only in Atua, but in the whole of Samoa - 'Aiga Sa Levalasi. 

Years later, messengers came from Lufilufi to invite Queen Salamasina and Levalasi (Sooa’e) to visit their town and district. The ladies decided to accept, as one of Salamasina’s titles was that of Tui Atua, she could not lightly turn down the invitation. Lufilufi was the (capital) of Atua and a potent supporter of her government.

Levalasi rejoiced at the thought of the visit, for it would afford her an opportunity to meet her many relatives in that district. Besides, she had by no means forgotten the crime that had been perpetuated upon her husband and still entertained hopes to discover the murderers.

On the following morning Salamasina and Levalasi left in a large double boat (alia) and arrived in the harbour of Saluafata in the afternoon.

After the evening meal the conversation turned on the political situation in Atua, and Sooa’e heard then that several Tongan war boats (alia) had recently arrived and were still lying in the harbour of Fagaloa. This surprised her and she thought it worthwhile to look into.

While Salamasina was inspecting the surroundings of the village, Sooa’e, who had stayed behind, tried to obtain more information about the Tongans now at Lona, Fagaloa. She soon learned that Leifi and Tautolo seemed to be on the best of terms with the strangers. This was rather interesting news for her, and she suspected that trouble was brewing.

Ulualofaiga, brother of Tuitoga Faaulufanua, was married to a Samoan woman of Leota’s family. He had been living at Lona already for a number of years. When he heard that the Queen, the grandchild of his brother, was in Lufilufi, he and the other chiefs of Fagaloa sent at once two orators to invite her to their village. Salamasina accepted and promised to be with them on the following day. As soon as they set sail the seas were very rough and treacherous.The always cautious Sooa’e suggested that they anchor at Musumusu where they could put up at Foganiutea. After the official reception of the royal party, Sooa’e told Salamssina all she had heard about the secret arrival of the Tongan boats and begged her to be very prudent in her dealings with the treacherous foreigners.

Less than an hour after their arrival, two Tongans emissaries entered the house. Following the custom of their country they prostrated themselves before the Queen and kissed her feet. Then, at Salamasina’s invitation, they sat down and said, “Ulualo, our chief, bids you welcome to Fagaloa. He would have tendered his homage personally but he is sick. He implores you therefore to visit him at Lona for he has news for you from Tonga which he would like to communicate to you himself.”

Salamasina thanked them and promised them a reply at a later hour. Thereupon the messengers bowed themselves out and returned to Lona.

On inquiring further, the Queen learned that six large Tongan war boats were lying in Lona. They had been there for several weeks, and there was such dissatisfaction in the village as the people found it extremely difficult to find food for so many visitors. None seemed to know the purpose of the Tongans’ malaga. Levalasi, who had a deeper understanding of the strangers doings said, “Tomorrow we shall sail to Lona in order to find out what all those Tongans want in Samoa. But as I fear trickery on their part, send secret messages to Lufilufi, Faleapuna, and Falefa to come in their war canoes and lay in wait behind the west cape of the bay. Bid them come in at the sound of the conch shell and surround the Tongan ships. Let another message be sent to the well armed warriors of Lepa, Lotofaga, and Salani. These shall come over the mountains and approach Lona from the rear so secretly that no one would suspect their presence."

The next day, a long row boat manned by twenty warriors was held ready for the Queen and her party. In a short time Lona was reached. There were but a few Tongans about, but they all prostrated themselves as Salamasina proceeded to the house of Ulualo.

The gray headed chief bade her welcome and expressed his regret that, on account of ill health, he had not been able to call on her at Musumusu. Salamasina then inquired about the news from Tonga. Ulualo answered, “The last boat arriving from Tonga brought bad tidings. It seems that Vaetoe, your mother, is seriously ill and desires to see you. The boats are ready to leave for Tonga at a moment’s notice and we will gladly take you there if such be your desire.”

Salamasina was much upset to hear about the sickness of her mother. So she said, “Why did you not inform me of this immediately? The Tongan boats have been here for many a day. Do you not know that such gross negligence is worthy of the severest punishment?’

Ulualo had not expected her acute observation or this admonition, but astute he was, he replied, “Your Highness will know that in Tonga the messengers are often killed for the bad news they bring. Fearing for his life, the bearer of this message came to me; but being laid up I could not transmit it to you as soon as I should have liked. Hold me therefore excused as well as my poor countryman.”

While the above conversation continued, Sooae’s attention had been much engaged by the activities outside. It had not escaped her that the Tongans were gathering in ever increasing numbers. Already, the guest house was completely encircled. When she noticed her old enemies Leifi and Tautolo among the group of strangers, she began to fear for the safety of the Queen.

Again, Salamasina addressed herself to Ulualo, “Perhaps my mother is already dead. Where is the messenger? Bring him before me so that I may question him myself.”

Ulualo answered, “The messenger is in the bush hiding out of fear. I know your mother is alive. Her sickness is a lingering one. It is believed she is suffering from an aito who is eating away at her lungs.”

“She would like to see you before she rejoins her ancestors. So curtail your visit here and let us go to Tonga before it is too late. The boats you see in the harbour are among the best we have and they will afford you every comfort for the long journey. The Tongan warriors will see to your safety.”

At a sign from Ulualo, more strangers who until then had been hidden, came forward to join their comrades. When the ever watchful Sooa’e saw this, she ordered the Salelesi, her attendant, to go and blow the shell to call the several Samoan ships into the harbor. Ulualo and his Tongans, greatly startled, pricked their ears. Fear and astonishment showed in their faces when they saw several huge Samoan boats come into view. As the fleet encircled the Tongan canoes, the warriors or Lepa, Lotofaga and Salani descended from the mountains, trapping the Tongan forces anchored at Fagaloa Bay.  foiling Leifi and Tautolo's plot to have Queen Salamasina taken away. The two women had turned the tables on their would-be captors.

Fully realizing the narrowness of her escape, she turned to Ulualo and said, “What is the meaning of this? How did you dare bring all these warriors into my domain? You no doubt, intended to abduct me and bring disorder to Samoa. I, more and more, can see through you and all the lies you told me. Send all your men away at once. Let them depart from our shores this very day. But as for you, you will remain as hostage, and woe to you if any of your men are found here after this night. Out of my sight, and see you obey my orders.”

Ulualo, cowed by the passionate words of the Queen, did not stand on ceremony and left at once. The Tongans had seen the danger they were in, and thinking that discretion was the better part of valour, they were much pleased to carry out Ulualo’s orders.

As these events unfolded, Sooa’e noticed that Leifi and Tautolo had disappeared. Their friendship with the Tongans and their general attitude were suspicious and Sooa’e, who had never trusted them, was determined to find the truth. At this moment, Leutele, the leader of the Falefa fleet, entered the house swinging his mighty war club. Addressing the Queen he said, “Your Highness, I hear that this man” – pointing to Ulualo – “is a traitor and a rascal. Say but the word and he shall die at my hand though he is my own daughter’s husband.”

Salamasina, however, quieted him saying, “Leutele, let him live, for he is the uncle of my mother and your son-in-law. Yet, if ever again he brings an invading army into Samoa, then his life shall be forfeited.”

Ulualo hearing these words, prostrated himself before the Queen and kissing her feet, he said, “I deserve death for having brought this armed force into your country. My life and that of all the Tongan warriors is in your hands, yet in accordance with the Samoan proverb, ‘E gase toa, ae ola pule’ (Warriors die, but clemency is remembered), you prefer to be indulgent and let us live. As a token of our deepest gratitude I shall now tell you the whole truth about what happened today.”

Ulalofaiga then revealed Leifi and Tautolo's true intentions. Begging for mercy, he explained, “As you know, I have been living here peacefully for many years. Some time ago, Leifi and Tautolo came from Aleipata. They poured fine words and promises into my ears and finally induced me to assemble here the warriors you saw. Their aim was to entice you on to a Tongan ship there to destroy you, just as they had destroyed the lives of Matautia and Tamalelagi. Once you had been disposed of, they intended to install someone of their choosing as Tui Atua and, if possible, to have him recognized as your successor, i.e. as Tupu of Samoa. Since seeing the failure of their evil plans they now have fled. But they will try again, so beware of those two traitors. Furthermore I have here one hundred fine mats. Among them, the one that has been woven on the Vaa-aitu of Savea Siuleo, and which is known all over Tonga and Samoa by the name of Lagavaa (woven on a ship). Henceforth, I and my house, will be your servants.”

War: Falefa stands with King Fonoti 
One of the early powerful figures of Samoa was Faumuina le Tupufia of Savaii. A direct descendant of Queen Salamasina's daughter, Fofoaivaoese, he was called le tupufia due to being somewhat close becoming King, although never fully attaining it. Despite this, his royal pedigree was undeniable, a fact that would set the stage for one of the great sagas in Samoan history.

Faumuina had three children, two sons and one daughter. The sons were named Fonoti and Vaafusuaga and the daughter was named Samalaulu. They are commonly known in the traditions of Samoa as “The Three of Faumuina.” Each child was by a different mother so that after the death of their father they individually contended for the Kingship.

Having waged war successfully for the crown against his kin, Fonoti was proclaimed King in c.1640. He conferred many honours upon those chiefs and Districts that had fought for him and such honours and privileges are remembered and passed down by Samoa's Tulafale (Orator chiefs) in customary salutations down to the present day.

For contending with the Manono, Sapapali'i and Saleaumua naval forces and securing his victory at sea, the leaders of Faleapuna and Fagaloa were granted a district of their own called Vaa-o-Fonoti (literally, Fonoti's canoe). For leading Fonoti's land forces and securing victory on land, Falefa was designated the salutation of Aai o Fonoti or Aai o le Tupu (the seat of Fonoti or seat of the King). Falefa continued as the administrative centre of Fonoti, Muagututi'a and Tupua's respective malo until the time of Fonoti's grandson, King Afoa (later Afoafouvale), who chose to rule from Lufilufi, the centre of Ātua.

These honors are reflected to this day in the Fa'alupega o Samoa (customary honorific salutations of Samoa) of the respective villages and in those of Falefa.

'Aiga Sā Fenunuivao and their Tama a 'Āiga, Tupua (later known as 'Tupua Tamasese') Historical Background 

The pāpā titles confer upon individual holders authority over designated territory or, in the case of a Tafa'ifā (holder of all four pāpā titles) status as King or Queen of all Samoa (excluding the Manu'a Group). However, these titles are usually contested exclusively among Samoa's royal lineages, each with a paramount title holder and a titular figure in whom the mana (honour) of the family is represented. These are called tama-a-'āiga ('sons of the royal families').

Sa Tupua and Sa Malietoa are the two principal royal lineages from whom many other high titles draw legitimacy and prestige. The older Sa Malietoa family dates back to the 13th century during the Tongan period and comprises Malietoa and his descendants. Sa Tupua came to the fore when it's titular ancestor, Queen Salamasina rose to power. The family is made up of her descendants and is headed by Tupua Tamasese.

Tupua Tamasese is the tama of the Sā Tupua, the descendants of Salamasina and comprises several notable families and lineages such as Sā Fenunuivao, Sā Levalasi, Aiga o Mavaega and others. Among these families, Sā Fenunuivao is the primary political family of Falefa and Salani and holds overall custodianship and authority over the Tupua Tamasese title.Fuiavailili: The first TupuaKing Muagututi'a, son of King Fonoti, married Fenunuivao, daughter of Leutele of Falefa. Because they had no children of their own, they adopted Fenunuivao's nephew Fuiavailili, from Salani, as their son and heir. Upon his arrival in Falefa, he was given the name 'Tupua' and was thereafter known as Tupua Fuiavailili, the first Tama-a-'āiga.

As the child was now the sole heir to King Muagututi'a, the powerful orator groups of Pule and Tumua performed their customary right of saesae laufa'i (investigating one's genealogical links) enquiring as to whether he possessed the necessary genealogical links in order to be worthy of tafa'ifa honours. Thus it was revealed that Fuiavailili's biological father was Fuimaono, and biological mother Sa'ilau, descendants of Fanene and direct descendants of Queen Salamasina's son and second child, Tapumanaia.

King Muagututi'a himself was descended from Queen Salamāsina's eldest child, Fofoaivao'ese. Thus it was that Tupua Fuiavailili, through both ancestral lines, was the first ruler of Samoa to have inherited from both of Queen Salamāsina's children, re-uniting the Salamasina lineages through his ancestor, Tapumanaia, Salamāsina's husband (from the Fuimaono and Fanene line), and Muagututi'a's ancestor Fofoaivao'ese, Salamasina's daughter with from a previous relationship with Alapepe, (from the Fonoti, Muagututi'a line). Having satisfied the requirements of having direct lineage to Salamāsina and demonstrable link to both lineages and prominent families, Tupua Fuiavailili was proclaimed the first Tama a 'Āiga and succeeded Muagututi'a to becoming King ('Tupu Tafa'ifā ).

 The Aloali'i: Luafalemana. 
From his four usuga (marriages), King Tupua Fuiavailili had five children. Two went on to become King, while the third went on to becoming one of the ancestors of Atua's other tama-a-'āiga title: Mata'afa. The beginnings of the tama-a-'āiga Matā'afa lineage is traced through to Luafalemana, son of King Tupua Fuiavailili.  This was enabled through the union of Luafalemana's daughter, Salaina'oloa of 'Aiga Sā Fenunuivao with Tuimavave (also known as Tauili'ili) of 'Aiga Sā Levālasi, issuing one of the progenitors of the Matā'afa title, Fa'asuamale'aui, in 1785. Tuimavave's other union with Letelesa issued the another progenitor of the title, Silupevailei. These two lines of Fa'asuamale'aui and Silupevailei are from whom all Mata'afa are selected. Family traditions differ on who was the first Mata'afa, but the majority of opinion favours Tafagamanu, grandson of Fa'asuamale'aui. Tuimavave's union with Tupua's granddaughter, Salaina'oloa, has resulted in the Luafalemana title's association with both the Tupua Tamasese and the Matā'afa titles. Several Matā'afa holders from Falefa also held the Tupua title concurrently, like Matā'afa Iosefo who became known as Tupua Matā'afa Iosefo. By joining the daughter of Luafalemana with Tuimavave, the Tui Atua line arrives at a harmonious junction between the two great Tama-a-'āiga families of Atua - 'Aiga Sā Levālasi and 'Aiga Sā Fenunuivao.

The Tupua Tamasese is selected from these three lines of descent:Luafalemana of Falefā, From Tupua's first marriage to Punipuao, daughter of Ala'iasa. Ancestor of the Matā'afa tama-a-'āiga through his daughter Salaina'oloa, who married Tuimavave of the Aiga Sā Levalasi and sired the elder Mata'afa line of Faasuamale'aui.Afoa of Palauli. Succeeded his father to become King and ruled from Lufilufi. Defeated in single combat by his brother, Galumalemana. Later named Afoafouvale, after his defeat.Galumalemana of Saleimoa. Succeeded his brother Afoa as King by defeating him at Maauga, Leulumoega. The current line of Tupua are from this line of descent and it was from among his descendants - Tamasese Titimaea - that Tamasese became part of the title, hence Tupua Tamasese 
 Tautisusua and Tufugatasi,''' from Tupua's fourth marriage to Matavaoilesasa.

Collectively, these titles are known as Aloali'i (Dauphins or heirs). The establishment of the institution of aloalii ensured the continuation of the Tupua's political influence through his descendants and to maintain in perpetuam the genealogical linkages between the first Tupu Tafa'ifa, Queen Salamasina and later Tupu Tafa'ifa, King Fonoti, from whom later rulers would draw legitimacy.

 Politics & Governance 
Falefa means the 'House of Four', indicative of the four sub-villages which make up the main components of Falefa; Sagogu, Gagaemalae, Saleapaga, Sagapolu. Each of these sub villages comprises families, the heads of which, represent their extended families and their respective area at Falefa's Village Council, headed by the two senior tulafale-alii of the village (Matua), Moe'ono & 'Iuli. Falefa is administered and governed by Leutele, Lealaisalanoa, Alai'asā as the Alii (Chiefs) of Falefa and by both Matua (elder Orator-Chiefs or 'tulafale-alii') Moe'ono and 'Iuli. Leutele is the ranking alii of the village and Moe'ono is the ranking tulafale-alii. Lealaisalanoa is the second ranking alii with Alai'asā the third. 'Iuli is the tulafale-alii of Lealaisalanoa and is the other matua of Falefa. Leutele is addressed as Tinā o Tupua (Tupua's Mother), honoring the first Tupua's mother Fenunuivao and maternal Grandfather, Leutele. Moe'ono is customarily addressed as "le tamā o le nu'u" ('the father of the village) and alongside Tofua'iofo'ia is the principal spokespersons for Aiga Sā Fenunuivao, Tupua's political family and heirs.

The establishment of Moe'ono and Leutele titles predate the Tongan period, as the primordial holders were the sons of Tui Atua Mua'iteleloa (one of the earliest holders of the Tui Atua pāpā title) and founders of Falefa somewhere between 300B.C - 200 A.D.

 The Village Fono: Falefā, Falelima & the Falefitu 
The convocation of a special meeting of the village fono is decided by 'Iuli or Moe'ono. The scale of the meeting varies depending on the situation. The most common meetings comprise only the four sub-villages of Falefa: Sagapolu, Saleapaga, Gaga’emalae and Sanonu. The range of participants define the three types of meetings. In this context, the word fale means sub-village. A fono falefa is then a fono in which only the matai from the four sub-villages of Falefa participate. A fono falelima is a fono with the four sub-villages of Falefa and the village of Falevao. A fono falefitu involves all the villages that are part of Falefa's traditional domain, which includes the four sub-villages of Falefa, Falevao and the two villages of Sauano and Saletele in the Fagaloa Bay.

 Selection of Falefa's two senior leaders: Leutele and Moeono 
Upon the death of a Moe'ono or Leutele, the district goes into an extended period of mourning and kicks off the procession of cultural protocol and rituals that follows. The funeral rites of the Leutele, Moe'ono, 'Iuli and Lealaisalanoa commence with the Lagi (sacred offering of rare fine mats and offerings) which is received by the Moe'ono. 

During this sede vacante period, the administration of Falefa is then passed to 'Iuli, Lealaisalanoa, Alai'asā and Falefa's other matai (chiefs of each family) until a Moe'ono or Leutele is appointed.

At the appointed time when an heir has been chosen, the proceedings of the saofa'i (bestowment ceremony) stipulate that only the two bearers of the titles of the two brothers - Moe'ono and Leutele - are part of this sacred ritual. Only once it has been completed with the completion of the 'ava ceremony and the title bestowed will 'Iuli lead the rest of the village chiefs  in to the residence to join them ('usu le nuu). The ceremony is guarded by Tupua ma le Aumaga (the name for Falefa's untitled men's guild).

The last holder of the Leutele title was Leutele Tapusatele Keli Tuatagaloa until his passing in 2012. The late Moe'ono Leateafaiga Atoafuaiupolu Penitito Alai'asa is the most recent holder of the Moe'ono title, which he held until his passing in 2018. The two titles have enjoyed a long tradition of only ever having a single holder of the respective titles at any given time, save for a brief period when there were multiple Leutele title holders.

As of 2018, both titles remain vacant pending appointment of the new holders by the respective heirs.

 Folklore 

 Lautivunia: The Tu'i Tonga and Tui Atua Leutelelei'ite 
The Tui Tonga (ruler of Tonga) had two sons. The elder was named Tuitonga after his father, the younger, Lautivunia. Lautivunia had an affair with his brother's wife. When the affair became known, the older brother was very angry.

As is the custom, the younger brother made a peace offering of cooked food wrapped in tolo (ordinary sugar cane) and fiso (wild sugar cane) leaves. These leaves underlined the message, ‘Please forgive me, for we are brothers.’

But Tuitoga was not placated and Lautivunia made another peace offering, which included the flesh of ordinary bananas and of the lei (wild banana). The two varieties of banana underlined the message, ‘We are flesh and blood – surely you can find it in your heart to forgive me?’ Tuitoga was still not placated. So Lautivunia decided that if his brother would not accept his food offerings he would offer his life. He dug a hole where his catamaran was housed, fixed spears with points upward at the bottom of the hole, and threw himself on the spears. The force of his action caused the surrounding earth and sand to cave in and cover him.

When Lautivunia's disappearance was noticed, his father and brother sent out search parties to look for him. One party reached Falefa, Samoa. Tui Atua Leutele said, ‘You need not have come so far. Lautivunia is in Tonga under his catamaran.’

So the search party returned to Tonga and found the body of Lautivunia. The Tui Toga felt obliged to reciprocate this favour from Tui Atua Leutele and instructed the search party to return to Samoa with the finest of his fine mats, which he named Le Ageagea o Tumua (the substance of Tumua). In addition, he recognised Tui Atua Leutele's seer abilities by naming him Leutele Leiite, that is, Leutele with the prophetic powers.

The title of Leiite survives today as one of the titles of the Sā Leutele family.

 The Ravages of War: 'Iuli Potini calls for Peace 
In later centuries, a great war between Tuamasaga and the two allies, Atua and A'ana ravaged the country. Having been defeated, Malietoa Uitualagi and the Tuamasaga army sought refuge at Ana o Seuao in Sa'anapu, Safata. Atua and A'ana forces gave chase and as they arrived at Ana, prepared to complete their victory by burning the entire region and killing off the rest of Malietoa's troops.

The stage was set for perhaps the most celebrated of all Samoan orations. Among the warriors of Atua was the orator (tulafale) Iuli Potini of Falefa; and he it was, who, in an effort to save the people of Tuamasaga from the peril which confronted them, spoke with unflagging fervour for two full days and nights entreating the leaders of Atua and A'ana to have mercy on their captives. His oration was not, however, a disinterested appeal, for in the cave together with her husband, Pulemagafa—an orator (tulafale) of Fangali'i (a village in Tuamasaga), was the daughter of Iuli and her two children. The daughter's name is said to have been Talalaufala, and her two children were Salamaleulu, a girl, and Falefataali'i, a boy. This boy Falefataali'i, was the sole surviving male descendant of Iuli Potini and would upon Iuli's death have inherited his lands and title. According to Samoan custom he would be termed “o le gafa malō o Iuli”, and his position is one of great importance. It was in an attempt then to preserve the life of this boy and so maintain his family line intact that Iuli spoke for so long and with such vehemence. Iuli's remarkable oration is still remembered throughout all Samoa in the expression: “O se Iuli”  which is used in reference to any orator who speaks with great persistence and to great length. The tract of land in which the cave lies is still known as Potini in memory of Iuli.

Iuli's words were heard by the people of Tuamasaga, and the nature of his oration was conveyed to Malietoa and the other chiefs and orators within the cave. Pulemagafa, too, must have heard the story of Iuli's plea, and old and blind as he was, he made his way forward to the mouth of the cave guided by his son Falefataali'i. As he groped his way he was assailed by the taunts of his fellow captives, for to them he was making but a hopeless gesture. He pressed on however until gaining the mouth of the cave, and questioning his son so as to determine the identity of those without, he made an oration in reply to Iuli and the chiefs and orators of Atua and A'ana, pleading for deliverance. Pulemagafa's earnest appeal was poorly received, for great was the rancour between the warring districts, until he announced that Malietoa was willing to pay as ransom (togiola, which literally means, ‘the price of one's life') the island of Tutuila. Such an offer was eagerly grasped, and before long the great sailing canoes of Atua were heading eastward to claim the prize, while Malietoa and his crest-fallen followers returned to their villages. This famous incident is still remembered in the proverb—“Ua tosi fa'alauti le eleele o Tutuila” (The land of Tutuila has been torn to shreds even as the strands of a native skirt), and to this day many of the village names and chiefly titles of Tutuila still bear witness to the nature of their origin, derived directly as they were from the district of Atua.

For his efforts in ending the conflict, 'Iuli Potini was elevated from tulafale to tulafale-alii and given the rank of Matua by Moe'ono and Leutele. Furthermore, his kava cup was named “Lau ipu lenei; lua po, lua ao” (This is your kava cup: ‘The two nights and the two days’). Thus is the feat of his famous ancestor still commemorated and today, his descendant 'Iuli continues to govern Falefa alongside Moe'ono and Leutele.

 Independence: Moe'ono & The Mau Movement 
In the early days of the Mau movement, the Luafalemana Moe'ono Ta'ele resigned from his post at the administration's Native Police to assist with efforts to garner national support for the fledgling independence movement. As Pule (the orators and polity heads of Savaii) were yet to pledge their unanimous support, Moe'ono Luafalemana Ta'ele was tasked with leading a fleet of fautasi (canoes) together with Upolu's orators Tumua to ask for Savaii's support. Choosing to arrive at Satupa'itea instead of Sale'aula, Moe'ono recalled Falefa's earlier support for the Mau a Pule  (which Savaii's orators had led during the German administration, a precursor to the Mau Movement) and called on Asiata to have Pule (Savaii's orator polity and counterpart to Upolu's Tumua) reciprocate their solidarity by joining forces with them in order to further strengthen the cause for independence.

His son, Moe'ono Alai'asā Kolio OBE, would later become one of the Framers of the Constitution of the newly Independent State of Western Samoa.

 Title Contention and Controversies 
 Disputes over the Tupua Tamasese title
Falefa and the Tupua Tamasese have a long history, dating back to when the first Tupua was installed by his family at Falefa in c.1550. In terms of succession to the title, the family has been among the least controversial of all Tama a 'Āiga families. Family consensus decided successors rather than the court. However, these amicable relations were eventually fractured in 1965 when a major split appeared over the successor to Samoa's former co-Head of State Tupua Tamasese Mea'ole, who died two years earlier. Two first cousins and sons of previous holders vied for the title and the family was forced to resort to the court for a settlement.

The family had been unable to agree between two candidates, Lealofi IV, the son of assassinated Mau leader Tupua Tamasese Lealofi III, and Tufuga Efi, the son of Samoa's former co-Head of State Tupua Tamasese Mea'ole. The two men were first cousins, and their fathers had both held the titles. After deliberations dissolved, both were subsequently installed at separate ceremonies by the different political families of Sā Tupua: Lealofi IV by 'Āiga Sā Fenunuivao of Falefa and Salani, and Tufuga Efi by 'Āiga o Mavaega (of Faleasi'u and Asau in Savai'i) and by a branch of 'Āiga Sā Tuala from Fasito'outa. The latter's installation took 'Āiga Sā Fenunuivao by surprise and was immediately met with stern rejection.

Both candidates were genealogically eligible, being descended from their common ancestor, Tupua Fuiavailili. However, Lealofi had the advantage of having the unanimous support of 'Āiga Sā Fenunuivao, the title's main political family, on the grounds that his father was older than Tufuga Efi's father and he himself was the elder candidate. The subsequent court battle saw a unanimous endorsement of Lealofi IV's appointment.  However, Tufuga Efi's supporters returned to the court to press two more lines of argument. First they argued that the title should be appointed and conferred by the immediate heirs of recent holders. 'Āiga Sā Fenunuivao pointed out their right to step in and decide, especially seeing as there would inevitably be disagreement among descendants and pointing to the fact that Sā Fenunuivao were descendants themselves, a view also endorsed by the court. Second, Tufuga's supporters argued that the conjugate titles - Tupua and Tamasese - be split in two. They argued that the Tamasese name constituted a title in its own right and urged the court to award the Tupua title to Lealofi and the Tamasese title to Tufuga Efi. However, the court rejected this argument on the grounds that without Tupua, Tamasese could not be constituted as a title and that Tupua without Tamasese would disqualify Tupua from the rank of a Tama a 'Āiga.

The court ruled in favour of 'Āiga Sā Fenunuivao's candidate, Lealofi IV who would go on to be elected Prime Minister of Samoa.

 The Second Dispute 
Upon Tupua Tamasese Lealofi IV's death in 1983, the question as to a successor was raised yet again with Tupuola Efi once again staking his claim. However, this would require 'Āiga Sā Fenunuivao agreeing to his appointment. Salani agreed however, Falefa and Lufilufi opposed. Despite the stalemate, Tupuola Efi pressed his claim and proceeded without the unanimous support of Āiga Sā Fenunuivao. On the morning of his installation ceremony at Vaimoso, the nation's public broadcaster, Radio 2AP, read an announcement from the Moe'ono at the time, Moe'ono Alai'asā Kolio, notifying the country that 'Āiga Sā Fenunuivao as well as the leaders of Lufilufi had not sanctioned Tupuola Efi's ascension to the title and would not allow for the ceremony to proceed at the title's appurtenant maota at Mulinu'ū ma Sepolata'emo in Lufilufi. This effectively nullified Tupuola Efi's grasp for the title yet again.

In 1986, Tupuola Efi approached the now ailing Moe'ono Kolio to ask for Āiga Sā Fenunuivao's unanimous blessing. Despite their initial refusal, both Falefa and Lufilufi eventually agreed. Thus 'Āiga Sā Fenunuivao joined with 'Āiga o Mavaega and 'Āiga Sā Tuala to jointly confer the Tupua Tamasese title on Tupuola Efi in an installation ceremony at Vaimoso in November, 1986, jointly registering the title under their family names.

However, the right of joint conferral was later challenged in court, with the main families within the Sa Tupua clan - Sā Fenunuivao, Sā Tuala and Aiga 'o Mavaega - disputing authority over the title. The matter was decisively settled when in 1987, the court ruled that the right of conferral of the Tupua Tamasese title belonged exclusively to 'Āiga Sā Fenunuivao of Falefa and Salani.

 Line of Succession 
Le Afioga i le Tama-a-'Āiga, Tupua Tamasese 
King Tupua Fuiavailili, descendant of Queen Salamasina, adopted son of King Muagututi'a and Fenunuivao, daughter of Leutele

King Afoa (defeated in single combat by his brother, Galumalemana. Thereafter named Afoafouvale, "he who rebels for no good reason.")

King Galumalemana (the Aloalii as an institution of succession is established under Galumalemana)

King Nofoasaefā (tyrant, assassinated by rebels in Savai'i)

King I'amafana (the last King installed by Lufilufi and the elders of Atua. Allegedly willed his kingdom to Malietoa Vainuupo; succeeded by Safeofafine but was killed in combat; kingship passes to Tamafaigā)

1751 - 1830: Maeaeafe Mataafa

1830 - 1860: Tupua Moegagogo

1860s - 1891: Tui Aana Tui Atua Tupua Tamasese Titimaea (this is the first time Tamasese is used together with the Tupua title)

1891 - 1915: Tupua Tamasese Lealofi-o-a'ana I, son of Tupua Tamasese Titimaea.

1915 - 1918: Tupua Tamasese Lealofi-o-a'ana II, eldest son of Tupua Tamasese Lealofi-o-a'ana I

1918 - 1929: Tupua Tamasese Lealofi-o'a'ana III (Mau leader, assassinated by NZ Soldiers during Black Saturday), younger brother of Tupua Tamasese Lealofi-o-a'ana II

1929 - 1963: Tupua Tamasese Mea'ole (Co-Head of State with Malietoa Tanumafili II after Independence), younger brother of  Tupua Tamasese Lealofi-o-a'ana III

1963 - 1983: Tui Atua Tupua Tamasese Lealofi-o-a'ana IV (this is the first time Tamasese  is formalised as part of the Tupua title) - Third Prime Minister of Samoa, son of Tupua Tamasese Lealofi-o-a'ana III

1986–present: Tui Atua Tupua Tamasese Efi (Former Prime Minister and Head of State 2007–2017), son of Tupua Tamasese Mea'ole.

 Aloali'i: Le Afioga i le Aloali'i, Luafalemana 
Luafalemana Leo’o

Luafalemana Tupua Puta

Luafalemana Fagavale

Luafalemana Taua’aletoa Taligamaivalu Leala’iasalanoa

Luafalemana Moe'ono Alai'asā Ta'eleomoamoa (Taele)

(also bestowed to two other holders by Luafalemana Taele Moe'ono)

 Luafalemana Aukusitino (‘matupalapala’ or gift) 
 Luafalemana Eseese (‘matupalapala’ or gift)

Present: Vacant

 Tulafale-ali'i: Le Tofa i le Matua, le tamā o le nu’u, Moe'ono 
(Title founded in early pre-history: Records prior to 1855 available at Lands & Titles Court, Samoa)

1855 - 1915: Moe'ono Sufalī Luafalemana Taligamaivalu.

1915 - 1916: Moe'ono Faita Tailalo

1916 - 1957: Luafalemana Moe'ono Alai'asā Taeleomoamoa (Taele)

1957 - 1987: Moe'ono Alai'asā Kolio

1987 - 2018: Moe'ono Atoamafuaiupolu Tomanogi Penitito Alai'asā

2018–present: vacant

 Tamāalii: Le Afioga ia Leutele, le tinā o Tupua 
(Title founded in early pre-history: Records available at Lands & Titles Court, Samoa)

Leutele Malota I

Leutele Malota II

Leutele Upuolevavau

Leutele Faletui

Leutele Va'afusu'aga Poutoa

Leutele Taumoumea

Leutele Simaile Tuatagaloa

Leutele Vaeluaga Lutu

1940 - 2012: Leutele Tapusatele Keli Tuatagaloa

2012–present: Vacant

Tulafale-ali'i: Le Tofa i le Matua, 'Iuli 

(Records available at Lands & Titles Court, Samoa)

Iuli Tapa

Iuli Veni

Iuli Sefo I

Iuli Sefo II

Iuli Polailevao Salale Moananu

Iuli Laauliolemalietoa Polataivao Leuatea Schmidt

 Population 
The population of Falefa (exclusive of the other three villages that form the falefitu) is 1,563 (2016 Census).

South of the village settlement is Falefa Valley, Falefa's traditional territory southwards to neighbouring Lotofaga and eastwards to Fagaloa Bay.

 Fa'alupega: Charter and Salutations 
A village fa'alupega is essentially a series of salutations that refer to a village or district's most important titles and descent groups. It provides a basic outline of its basic hierarchy and genealogies of note, thus the order of mention is usually (but not always) relevant, depending on the location and context.

The basic structure of Falefā's fa'alupega, in its most reduced version, is composed of three main parts, with the third allowing several possible variations:
...'Aiga ma aloali'i  ...the chiefs (lit. 'Families') and the son (Luafalemana) of the royal chief (Tupua)
 ...afio mai Sā Fenunuivao ...to you Sā Fenunuivao (descendants of Fenunuivao,  family of Tupua Tamasese)

...oulua matua, Iuli ma Moe'ono  ...to you, the elder chief orators, 'Iuli and Moe'ono (rulers of Falefa)
...ma le putuputu o tagata o le Tui Atua  ...and the gathering of the people of the King of Atua  (or ...ma le tofi fa'asolo i tagata o le Tui Atua)  ...and the various appointments of the people of the King of Atua
The customary honorifics of Falefa are as follows:

Tulouna a le a'ai o Fonotī (le a'ai o le Tupu) ma fale e fagafua

Maliu mai  oulua matua: 'Iuli ma Moe'ono

a Fulumu’a na falelimaa’I fetalaiga ia te oe le Aai

Tulouna a le putuputu o tagata o le Tui Atua

Afio mai Sā Fenunuivao

Afio mai Leutele o le tina o Tupua

Afio mai Lealaisalanoa o le tei o Tupua, o le tama a Malili e fa

Afio mai Alai’asa na fita I tuga

Afio mai Luafalemana o le Aloalii.'''

Important Names & Places in Falefa

Malae Fono 
Moamoa, o le tua o Lalogafu'afu'a.

Maota o Alii 
Leutele - Vai'ili'ili ma Fogāvaiuta

Lealaisalanoa - Vaie'e

Alai'asā - Gataivai / Gataifusi

Suluvave - Malae

Laoa 
Moe'ono - Laloāoa

'Iuli - Nofopule

Sa'otama'ita'i 
Leutele - Sailau

Salanoa - Fenunuivao

Luafalemana - Salaina'oloa

Alai'asa - Punipuao

Suluvave - Aova'a

See also
Archaeology in Samoa

References

Populated places in Atua (district)